European route E 962 is a European B class road in Greece, connecting the city Eleusis – Thebes.

Route 
 
 Eleusis
 Thebes

External links 
 UN Economic Commission for Europe: Overall Map of E-road Network (2007)
 International E-road network

International E-road network
Roads in Greece